Laurent Bàn (born 3 April 1970s in Briey, France) is a French singer-songwriter.

Biography 
Laurent Bàn obtained a degree as a graphic designer-painter. He discovered the French musical Starmania from Michel Berger and Luc Plamondon and decided to study music and acting at the Nancy's conservatory.

Musicals 
He moved to Paris and played his first role in Alfredo Arias's musical : Heartbreak of an English she-cat (Peines de cœur d'une chatte anglaise) which won Molière awards for its staging and costumes in 2000. Then he played in many musicals : Hair, Notre-Dame de Paris, Zorro...
Laurent Bàn also performed on international's stages. In Italy he played in two musicals in Italian : Il Conte di Montecristo and Amleto, Dramma Musicale produced by Pierre Cardin. He participated in famous French musicals' tour in Asia of Notre-Dame de Paris and for the first time in Mozart, l'opéra rock playing Salieri.

Author 
Laurent Bàn is the author of two French adaptations' musicals : Le Journal d'Adam et Eve and Marlène D. The Legend.
He also leads a solo career. In 2005 his first album is edited : Ante. In 2016 Anteprima contains two tracks. His third album Prima is edited in 2018.

Musicals

Actor 
 1999-2001 : Heartbreak of an English she-cat (Les peines de cœur d'une chatte française) by  Alfredo Arias and René de Ceccaty - MC93 Bobigny, tour France and Italy : Victor
 2001 : Hair by James Rado, Gerome Ragni and Galt MacDermot, dir Sylvain Meyniac - Auditorium of Saint-Germain-des-Prés : Woof
 2001-2002 : Notre-Dame de Paris by Luc Plamondon and Richard Cocciante - Théâtre Mogador : Gringore and Phoebus
 2002-2003 : Le Petit Prince by Richard Cocciante and Élisabeth Anaïs, dir Jean-Louis Martinoty - Casino de Paris : Le Vaniteux
 2004 : Singin in Paris - Atrium Musical Magne, Hôtel Brossier 
 2004 : Chance ! by Hervé Devolder - Lucernaire : Fred
 2005-2006 : Notre-Dame de Paris by Luc Plamondon and Richard Cocciante - Palais des congrès de Paris, tour in  Asia : Phoebus
 2007 : Les Hors-la-loi by Alexandre Bonstein, dir Agnès Boury - Théâtre Marigny, tour : Carlo 
 2007 : Le Petit Prince  by Richard Cocciante and Élisabeth Anaïs, dir Jean-Louis Martinoty - Tour in Asia : L'aviateur
 2008 : Il Conte di Montecristo : The Musical by Francesco Marchetti, dir  Gino Landi - Rome : Villefort
 2009 : Zorro by Stephen Clark, adaptation  Éric Taraud and Marie-Jo Zarb, dir Christopher Renshaw, music Gipsy Kings - Folies Bergère : Zorro
 2009-2011 : Le Journal d'Adam et Eve by Mark Twain and Riccardo Castagnari, translation by Chiara Di Bari, adaptation by Laurent Bàn, dir Franck Harscouët - Lourdes, Le Grand Rex : Adam
 2009-2012 : Hair by James Rado, Gerome Ragni and Galt MacDermot, dir Ned Grujic - Le Trianon, tournée : Berger
 2013 : Là était l'Eden by Mark Twain and Riccardo Castagnari, translation by Chiara Di Bari, adaptation by Laurent Bàn, dir Franck Harscouët - Théâtre Michel : Adam
 2013-2014 : Amleto, Dramma Musicale by and dir Daniele Martini - Florence, Les Ambassadeurs in Paris : Hamlet
 2013-2014 : Farouche show,  Royal Palace de Kirrwiller
 2015-2016 : Aladin, faites un vœu ! by David Rozen and Marie-Jo Zarb - Théâtre Comédia, tour : Le Génie
 2015 : Mistinguett, reine des années folles by François Chouquet, Jacques Pessis and Ludovic-Alexandre Vidal, dir François Chouquet - Théâtre Comédia : Harry Pilcer
 2016 : Mozart, l'opéra rock by Dove Attia and Albert Cohen - South Korea : Salieri
 2017-2018 : Priscilla, Queen of the Desert, dir. Philippe Hersen - Casino de Paris : Dick
 2018 : Mozart, l'opéra rock by Dove Attia and Albert Cohen - Shanghai
 2018-2019 : Mozart, l'opéra rock by Dove Attia and Albert Cohen - Tour in China : Salieri
 2021 : Les Misérables by Victor Hugo - South Korea : Jean Valjean
 2021-2022: Notre Dame de Paris by Luc Plamondon and Richard Cocciante - Frollo Author 
 2009 : Marlène D. The Legend by and dir by Riccardo Castagnari, adaptation by Laurent Bàn, translation by Chiara Di Bari - Vingtième Théâtre, Paris
 2009 : Le Journal d'Adam et Eve by Mark Twain and Riccardo Castagnari, adaptation by Laurent Bàn, translation by Chiara Di Bari, dir Franck Harscouët - Lourdes

 Discography 

 Albums 
 2005 : Ante 2016 : Anteprima 2018 : Prima Single 
 2014 : Tu me mets à mort Filmography 
 2004 : The Phantom of the Opera by Joel Schumacher : Erik's French voice

 Award 
 2009 : Marius of best musical, French adaptation for Marlène D. The Legend''

References

External links 
 

1975 births
Living people
French composers
21st-century French singers
21st-century French male singers